Mucilaginibacter koreensis is a Gram-negative and strictly aerobic bacterium from the genus of Mucilaginibacter which has been isolated from leaf mold in Cheonan in Korea.

References

Sphingobacteriia
Bacteria described in 2014